Terrence Everett Anthony (born January 17, 1965) is a former American football defensive back who was a 1987 replacement player with the St. Louis Cardinals of the National Football League. He played college football at Iowa State.

NFL career

Atlanta Falcons 
Anthony was drafted in the ninth round of the 1987 NFL Draft by the Atlanta Falcons, with the 236th pick overall. The Falcons waived him on September 7, 1987, just one week before the team's first regular season game.

St. Louis Cardinals 
During the 1987 NFL season, there was a players' strike that resulted in the Week 4, Week 5, and Week 6 games being played with replacement players. Anthony was one of such players for the St. Louis Cardinals, playing in the Week 5 game on October 11, which was a 24–19 home win against the New Orleans Saints.

References 

1965 births
Living people
American football defensive backs
Iowa State Cyclones football players
National Football League replacement players
St. Louis Cardinals (football) players
Players of American football from Illinois

Sportspeople from East St. Louis, Illinois